The term November Revolution may refer to:

November Uprising, an uprising in partitioned Poland against the Russian Empire (also known as the "Cadet Revolution" or the "Polish–Russian War 1830-31")
October Revolution of 1917 in Russia, which took place in October according to the Julian calendar, but in November according to the Gregorian calendar
German Revolution of 1918–1919, a politically driven civil conflict in Germany at the end of World War I
November Revolution (physics), referring to the series of changes in particle physics triggered by the discovery of the charm quark in November 1974
Velvet Revolution, which ended the communist regime in Czechoslovakia in November 1989